Yu Yanli (born March 26, 1980 in Qingdao, Shandong) is a female Chinese sports sailor who competed for Team China at the 2008 Summer Olympics in women's three person keelboat.

Major performances
2001/2005 National Games - 5th/1st 470 class
2002 National Champions Tournament - 1st 470 class
2006 Asian Championships - 2nd 470 class
2007 Qingdao International Regatta - 6th Yngling class

References

1980 births
Living people
Chinese female sailors (sport)
Olympic sailors of China
Sportspeople from Qingdao
Sailors at the 2008 Summer Olympics – Yngling